Cimentul Stadium is a multi-use stadium in Fieni. It was the home ground of the defunct Cimentul Fieni. It holds 4,000 people.

Football venues in Romania
Dâmbovița County